Crazy and Mixed Up is a 1982 studio album by the American jazz singer Sarah Vaughan.

Vaughan was nominated for the Grammy Award for Best Jazz Vocal Performance, Female at the 26th Annual Grammy Awards for her performance on this album.

Reception

Reviewing the album for AllMusic, Scott Yanow wrote that "...even if the results are not all that unique, her voice is often in near-miraculous form. ...Sassy sounds in prime form, on such songs as "I Didn't Know What Time It Was," "Autumn Leaves," "The Island" and "You Are Too Beautiful." It is hard to believe, listening to her still-powerful voice on this CD reissue, that she had already been a recording artist for 40 years". The Penguin Guide to Jazz Recordings considers the album to be possibly Vaughan’s best for the Pablo label.

Track listing
 "I Didn't Know What Time It Was" (Richard Rodgers, Lorenz Hart) - 4:02
 "That's All" (Alan Brandt, Bob Haymes) - 4:04
 "Autumn Leaves" (Joseph Kosma, Johnny Mercer, Jacques Prévert) - 5:36
 "Love Dance" (Ivan Lins, Vítor Martins, Paul Williams) - 3:29
 "The Island" (Alan Bergman, Marilyn Bergman, Lins, Martins) - 4:30
 "Seasons" (Roland Hanna) - 5:20
 "In Love in Vain" (Jerome Kern, Leo Robin) - 3:09
 "You Are Too Beautiful" (Rodgers, Hart) - 3:36

Personnel 
 Sarah Vaughan - vocals
 Roland Hanna - piano
 Joe Pass - guitar
 Andy Simpkins - double bass
 Harold Jones - drums

References

1982 albums
Sarah Vaughan albums
Pablo Records albums